The Wakefields are an alt-country band based out of Seattle Washington that was formed in 2004 as the by-product of friendships started in previous projects.  In December 2004, they released a promotional EP, and soon followed with the release of a full-length CD titled Falling Down Blue. 

The debut CD from The Wakefields featured, horns, tympani, Hammond Organ, pedal steel, percussion and accordion, all wrapped into a package of West Coast Americana music that would never be found in Nashville.  Falling Down Blue contains twelve original songs and was recorded and produced by Seattle engineer Martin Feveyear who has worked with many great bands including The Presidents of the United States of America, The Minus 5 and The Village Green indie rock/country.

Discography
 Falling Down Blue (CD Sampler) 2004
 Hung By The Chimney - Limited Pressing - 2005
 Falling Down Blue - 2006

Members
 Jason Kardong - Vocals, Guitars, Pedal Steel
 Eric Himes - Bass, Backup vocals
 Lynn Sepeda - Drums, Percussion, Typani, Backup vocals
 Arne Chatterton - Hammond Organ, Piano, Backup vocals
 Zac Bogart - Lead Guitar

Guest musicians
 Nova Devonie - Accordion
 Billy Joe Huels - Trumpets
 Kaia Chessen - Cello
 Erica Brewer - Violin
 Martin Feveyear - Backup vocals
 Dan Tyack - Pedal Steel
 Ruby Dee – Backing Vocals

Collaborations
 Jason plays lap and pedal steel with Sera Cahoone and has toured with Band of Horses and Mt. Egypt.
 Eric recorded bass on Sera Cahoone's debut CD.  
 Arne played Hammond Organ on "One of these days" by West Valley Highway which was featured on the now cancelled television show Over There .

CD credits
 Recorded At Jupiter Studios (Seattle, WA)
 Additional Recording at Fastback Studios (Seattle, WA)
 Mastered At RFI Mastering by Rick Fisher

Label
 Released on the Eminence Records label

References

External links
 The Wakefields official site

American alternative country groups